Saint-Magloire is a municipality in Les Etchemins Regional County Municipality in the Chaudière-Appalaches region of Quebec, Canada. Its population was 712 as of the Canada 2021 Census. It was named in tribute to reverend Joseph-Magloire Rioux, first priest of the parish in 1863.

Prior to August 16, 1997 it was known as Saint-Magloire-de-Bellechasse.

References

Commission de toponymie du Québec
Ministère des Affaires municipales, des Régions et de l'Occupation du territoire

Municipalities in Quebec
Incorporated places in Chaudière-Appalaches